Just a Poet with Soul is the debut alternative hip hop album by Def Jef, released by Delicious Vinyl on November 14, 1989 (see 1989 in music).  The album was highly praised upon its release, with critics enjoying the sociopolitical lyrics.  Many have called the album a lost classic of hip hop.

It was in part produced by the Dust Brothers.

Track listing
"Droppin' Rhymes on Drums" (with Etta James)
"Givin' Em Rhythm"
"On the Real Tip"
"Poet With Soul"
"Give It Here"
"Do You Wanna Get Housed"
"Black to the Future"
"Do It Baby"
"God Made Me Funky"
"Downtown"
"Just A Poet"

Samples
Droppin' Rhymes on Drums
"Blow Your Whistle" by The Soul Searchers
Givin'em Rhythm
"Love Rap" by Spoonie Gee and The Treacherous Three
"Rebel Without a Pause" by Public Enemy
On the Real Tip
"Get Up, Get Into It, Get Involved" by James Brown
"Got to Be Real" by Cheryl Lynn
"Sing Sing" by Gaz
Poet With Soul
"Apache" by Incredible Bongo Band
Give It Here
"I Gotcha" by Joe Tex
"Bra" by Cymande
"Have Your Ass Home by 11:00" by Richard Pryor
"Dance With Me" by Peter Brown
"Holy Ghost" by Bar-Kays
"Give It to Me Baby" by Rick James
Do You Wanna Get Housed
"Party" by Van McCoy
Black to the Future
"The Ballot or the Bullet" by Malcolm X
"Synthetic Substitution" by Melvin Bliss 
"Hot Dawgit" by Ramsey Lewis
"Fly Like an Eagle" by Steve Miller Band
"UFO" by ESG
Do It Baby
"Action Speaks Louder Than Words" by Chocolate Milk
Just a Poet
"Hit or Miss" by Bo Diddley
"Mighty Fine" by Peter Jacques Band

References

1989 debut albums
Def Jef albums
Delicious Vinyl albums